is a passenger railway station located in the city of Chōfu, Tokyo, Japan, operated by the private railway operator Keio Corporation.

Lines 
Shibasaki Station is served by the Keio Line, and is located 13.3 kilometers from the starting point of the line at Shinjuku Station.

Station layout 
This station consists of two ground-level opposed side platforms serving two tracks,  connected to the station building by an underground passage.

Platforms

History
The station opened on April 15, 1913 and was relocated to its present location on December 17, 1927.

Passenger statistics
In fiscal 2019, the station was used by an average of 18,042 passengers daily. 

The passenger figures (boarding passengers only) for previous years are as shown below.

Surrounding area

See also
 List of railway stations in Japan

References

External links

Keio Railway Station Information 

Keio Line
Stations of Keio Corporation
Railway stations in Tokyo
Railway stations in Japan opened in 1913
Chōfu, Tokyo